Philip Wesley Jackson (December 2, 1928, in Vineland – July 21, 2015, in Chicago) was an American pedagogue who was professor emeritus at the University of Chicago. During his career, he also served as president of the American Educational Research Association and of the John Dewey Society. He coined the phrase "hidden curriculum" in his 1968 book entitled Life in Classrooms, in a section about the need for students to master the institutional expectations of school.

References 

1928 births
2015 deaths
People from Vineland, New Jersey
University of Chicago faculty
American educators